The Estadio Nacional Doroteo Guamuch Flores is a multi-use national stadium in Guatemala City, the largest venue in Guatemala. It was built in 1948, to host the Central American and Caribbean Games in 1950, and was renamed after long-distance runner Doroteo Guamuch Flores, winner of the 1952 Boston Marathon. It has a capacity of 26,000 seats.

Used mostly for football (soccer) matches, the stadium has hosted the majority of the home matches of the Guatemala national football team throughout its history, and is the home of local football club Comunicaciones F.C. The venue is operated by the Confederación Deportiva Autónoma de Guatemala (CDAG).

One of the worst disasters ever to occur in a sports venue took place at the stadium in 1996, when 83 people were killed because of a human avalanche on the stands.

General description 
The grass field of the Doroteo Guamuch Flores is surrounded by an eight-lane athletic track, which originally was made of sand, and later remodeled to have a synthetic tartan surface. The seating area is divided into five sections: Palco (located on the west, and the only section under roof), Tribuna (west, surrounding the Palco), Preferencia (east), General Norte (north), and General Sur (south, where the main entrance is located).

History 

The stadium was built in 1948, as part of the project to build a group of sports facilities known as Ciudad Olímpica, in the Zone 5 of the Guatemalan Capital. Originally named Estadio Olímpico – erroneously, since it has never hosted an olympic competition –, it is primarily constructed of reinforced concrete, which is why sometimes it is colloquially referred to as Coloso de Concreto. It was inaugurated on February 23, 1950, to host the VI Central American and Caribbean Games, at which local runner Doroteo Guamuch won the half marathon event, and on 26 February, the Guatemala national football team played against Colombia, winning the match 2-1, thus inaugurating the football events at the stadium.

After Doroteo Guamuch's triumph in the 1952 Boston Marathon, the Guatemalan government renamed the stadium after the name he was internationally known by, Mateo Flores, in recognition to his local and international achievements. Since then, the stadium has also been colloquially called El  Mateo. On August 9, 2016, the Congress decreed that the stadium be renamed Doroteo Guamuch Flores, Mateo Flores' birth name.

On 18 January 1959 the stadium hosted a friendly football match between CSD Comunicaciones and Santos FC, the latter having Pelé as part of its squad. Santos took a 2-0 lead with goals by Pelé and Pepe, and nine minutes before the match ended, Francisco "Pinula" Contreras scored the 2-1. On 20 August 1960 Spanish giants Real Madrid visited Guatemala and played an exhibition match against Comunicaciones, winning 5-0.

In 1973 the stadium hosted the first Central American Games (Juegos Deportivos Centroamericanos), and has since been the venue for other two editions, in 1986 and 2001.

In July 1996, the sand track was upgraded to a tartan track, and the first time the new surface was used, local athlete Berner Rodas set a new national record at the 1500 metres event.

Throughout the years, the stadium has also been the usual finishing point of the annual Vuelta a Guatemala, Central America's largest single road cycling competition.

Numerous concerts have been hosted at the stadium, notably heavy metal band Metallica's performance in 2010.

The October 16 disaster 
On October 16, 1996, minutes before a 1998 FIFA World Cup qualification match between Guatemala and Costa Rica was to take place, at least 83 people were killed and more than 140 injured as an excessive number of fans attempted to enter the General Sur section, creating a human avalanche into the bottom of the stands, which is separated from the field by a fence. The sale of counterfeit tickets led to the excess of attending public, and the improper design of the building in the event of an emergency caused the fans to stampede and fall onto each other, causing many people to suffocate, in one of the worst tragedies to have occurred in a sports stadium.

The football match was immediately suspended by Guatemala President Alvaro Arzú, who was attending the event, and FIFA suspended the use of the stadium for official international matches until the safety issues were resolved, a ban that lasted over two years. Some of the problems have been addressed since, but as of 2006 the facility still presented multiple safety issues related to access and egress, and was considered prone to the occurrence of another emergency situation in the event of high attendance.

It is believed that near 50,000 people were trying to attend the stadium that day, which days before the event had been determined to be capable of 37,500 people and of a maximum "congested" seating of 47,500. The total amount of printed tickets was 45,796. According to a local analysis, the number of printed tickets topped the capacity of the stadium by itself, and the circulation of counterfeit tickets made excessive attendance uncontrollable. At the time, 13 administrative directors were syndicated responsible for the deaths and injuries, but all were able to have the charges dismissed. The CDAG does not assume responsibility for the safety of the facility, claiming that it is the duty of the entities who organize the sports events. The CDAG, however, does not offer a basic contingency or emergency plan for the use of the stadium.

To comply with some of the recommendations made by FIFA after the 1996 events, the capacity of the stadium – which had no individual or numbered seating at the time – was reduced to 26,000 in the 2000s.

References

Further reading 
  – Chronicle of the October 1996 tragedy
  – beginnings of the stadium and the Ciudad Olímpica.

External links 

 WorldStadiums.com entry
 Gallery of images
 Fussballtempel.net - Gallery of images

Multi-purpose stadiums in Guatemala
Football venues in Guatemala City
Athletics (track and field) venues in Guatemala
National stadiums
Sport in Guatemala City
Stadium disasters
Human stampedes in 1996
1996 in Guatemala
Man-made disasters in Guatemala
Sports venues completed in 1948